St Tola goats cheese is a range of  handmade goat's milk cheese made in Inagh, County Clare.  A range of cheese are produced varying from fresh soft cheese to a Gouda style hard cheese.

History 
Originally, the business was set up by Meg and Derrick Gordan on their 25-acre farm in the early 1980s, but since 1999 has been taken over by their neighbour, Siobhán Ni Ghairbhith, on her farm.

Products
St Tola produce a number of goat's milk cheeses:
 St Tola Log Fresh is a fresh cheese available as log
 St Tola Log Mature is a more mature version of the fresh log
 St Tola Crottin are small rounds of fresh goats cheese
 St Tola Divine is a spreadable cream cheese
 St Tola Original is a slice of the mature log
 St Tola Hard Cheese is a gouda style hard goats' cheese.
 St Tola Greek Style is a firm cheese with a mild salty flavour.
 St Tola Ash Matured soft cheese with an ash coating
 St Tola Cranberry soft cheese with cranberry

Awards
2012 Premio Roma award Italy
 2011 Awarded a 2 star Gold award for hard goats' cheese at the 2011 Great Taste Awards.
 2010 Awarded the best organic retail product at Bord Bia's National Organic Awards
 2010 Awarded a 2 star Gold award for hard goats' cheese at the 2010 Great Taste Awards.

See also
 List of goat milk cheeses

References

Irish cheeses
Food and drink in Ireland
Goat's-milk cheeses